Lisandra Guerra Rodriguez (born 31 October 1987, Matanzas) is a Cuban racing cyclist.

Major results

2005
1st 500 m TT, UCI Track Cycling World Championships – Juniors
1st Sprint, UCI Track Cycling World Championships – Juniors
1st Pan American Championships, Track, 500 m
2nd Pan American Championships, Track, Sprint
2nd Pan American Championships, Track, Keirin

2006
1st Pan American Championships, Track, 500 m
1st Pan American Championships, Track, Keirin
2nd Pan American Championships, Track, Sprint
3rd 500 m TT, UCI Track Cycling World Championships
2nd Moscow, Sprint
1st Moscow, 500 m

2007
1st Los Angeles, 500 m
3rd Los Angeles, Team Sprint
2nd 500 m TT, UCI Track Cycling World Championships
2nd Pan American Championships, Track, Keirin
1st Pan American Championships, Track, 500 m TT
1st Pan American Championships, Track, Sprint
2nd Pan American Championships, Track, Team Sprint
1st Aigle, 500 m
3rd Aigle, Elimination race
2nd Aigle, Keirin
2nd Sydney, 500 m
1st Beijing, 500 m

2008
1st Los Angeles, 500 m

2011
1st Pan American Games, Track, Sprint
2013
Copa Cuba de Pista
1st Keirin
1st Sprint
1st Team Sprint (with Laura Arias)
1st 500m Time Trial
2014
Pan American Championships
1st  Sprint
1st  500m Time Trial
3rd  Team Sprint (with Marlies Mejias Garcia)
Central American and Caribbean Games
1st  Keirin
1st  Sprint
1st  Team Sprint (with Marlies Mejias Garcia)
1st  500m Time Trial
Copa Cuba de Pista
1st Keirin
1st Sprint
1st Team Sprint (with Laura Arias)
1st 500m Time Trial
Cottbuser SprintCup
2nd Keirin
3rd 500m Time Trial
2nd Sprint, Cottbuser Nächte

2015
Cottbuser SprintCup
1st 500m Time Trial
2nd Keirin
3rd Sprint
Pan American Games
2nd  Keirin
2nd  Team Sprint (with Marlies Mejias Garcia)
2nd Keirin, GP von Deutschland im Sprint
Pan American Track Championships
3rd Sprint
3rd 500m Time Trial
3rd Keirin, Oberhausen
3rd Keirin, Cottbuser SprintCup

2016
Cottbuser SprintCup
1st Keirin
1st 500m Time Trial
2nd Sprint
2nd Sprint, Grand Prix of Poland
2nd Sprint, GP von Deutschland im Sprint
3rd Sprint, Fenioux Piste International

References

External links

 https://web.archive.org/web/20111122051525/http://info.guadalajara2011.org.mx/ENG/CT/CTR173A_CTW0010011@@@@@@@ENG.htm

1987 births
Living people
Cuban female cyclists
Cyclists at the 2007 Pan American Games
Cyclists at the 2008 Summer Olympics
Cyclists at the 2011 Pan American Games
Cyclists at the 2012 Summer Olympics
Cyclists at the 2015 Pan American Games
Cyclists at the 2016 Summer Olympics
Cyclists at the 2019 Pan American Games
Olympic cyclists of Cuba
Sportspeople from Matanzas
UCI Track Cycling World Champions (women)
Pan American Games gold medalists for Cuba
Pan American Games silver medalists for Cuba
Pan American Games medalists in cycling
Central American and Caribbean Games gold medalists for Cuba
Central American and Caribbean Games bronze medalists for Cuba
Cuban track cyclists
Competitors at the 2006 Central American and Caribbean Games
Central American and Caribbean Games medalists in cycling
Medalists at the 2007 Pan American Games
Medalists at the 2011 Pan American Games
Medalists at the 2015 Pan American Games
Medalists at the 2019 Pan American Games
21st-century Cuban women
Competitors at the 2014 Central American and Caribbean Games